YouTube Rewind 2018: Everyone Controls Rewind (also known as YouTube Rewind 2018 and Everyone Controls Rewind) is a video that was uploaded to the official channel of the video-sharing website YouTube on December 6, 2018, as the ninth installment of the YouTube Rewind series. The video featured references to Fortnite Battle Royale and starred YouTubers and online celebrities such as Ninja and Marques Brownlee, as well as celebrities like Will Smith and Trevor Noah. It is the first video in the YouTube Rewind series to feature a combination of animation and live-action sequences.

YouTube Rewind 2018 was panned by critics, YouTubers, and viewers alike, who dubbed it the worst YouTube Rewind video to date. The video was criticized for featuring obscure or unpopular YouTubers; the inclusion of unpopular or outdated trends; and the exclusion of many prominent YouTubers of the year, such as Shane Dawson, MrBeast, and PewDiePie, as well as popular rivalries such as KSI vs Logan Paul and PewDiePie vs T-Series. However, its animated sequences were praised and Will Smith's appearance in the video became an Internet meme.

By December 13, 2018, only a week after its upload, Everyone Controls Rewind had over 10 million dislikes, making it the most-disliked video on YouTube, a record that was previously held by the music video for Justin Bieber's "Baby" for over seven years.

Overview 
The video is themed around everyone being able to control YouTube Rewind, with various featured personalities describing what events they want to review. The video begins with actor Will Smith on the Swiss Alps suggesting the inclusion of popular video game Fortnite and YouTuber Marques Brownlee if he could control rewind in the video. The camera then cuts to Brownlee, other YouTubers and Twitch streamer Ninja, as the bus driver, conversing inside a battle bus, a Fortnite reference. "I Like It" by famous rapper Cardi B is played on the radio during the scene as well.

The following scene depicts a group of YouTube personalities surrounding a campfire. Casey Neistat and the Merrell Twins suggest that the Rewind should mention K-pop, after which the video cuts to Neistat, among others, imitating the music video of "Idol" by K-pop group BTS.

The video then cuts back to the campfire, as one YouTuber proposes a reference to the wedding of Prince Harry and Meghan Markle, but comedian Michael Dapaah establishes that the internet meme 'Bongo Cat' will be the groom. Following the wedding scene, Safiya Nygaard suggests a science experiment involving melting lipstick. Another then suggests the inclusion of electronic musician Marshmello, whose mask is removed, revealing Mason Ramsey underneath. The video then cuts to a group doing a mukbang in Korea.

Eventually, the scene shifts back to the campfire, when animator TheOdd1sOut suggests the inclusion of the "In My Feelings" challenge. The video rapidly cuts between scenes of various YouTubers and celebrities dancing to Drake's song "In My Feelings", including scenes of talk show hosts Trevor Noah and John Oliver performing dances from Fortnite. Here, animator Jaiden Animations included several easter eggs, comprising references to other memes and events of the year, such as Ugandan Knuckles, an invitation to Super Smash Bros. Ultimate and the KSI vs. Logan Paul boxing match, a group of items on the wall that spell out "Sub 2 PewDiePie", as well as PewDiePie's swivel chair.

The video once again cuts back to the group sitting around the campfire, with Lilly Singh claiming that the video should feature "the people who managed to do something bigger than themselves". Then several Youtubers give shoutouts to various groups of people, including "everyone who proved it's OK to talk about mental health" and a shoutout to "all women in 2018 for finding their voices". Afterwards, Elle Mills decides to read a faux comments section for further suggestions on what to feature in the Rewind.

Various comments are featured, leading to the inclusion of more pop culture moments that took place over the past year. Some (including actress Lele Pons) take part in a fashion show, wearing the costumes featured in Kanye West and Lil Pump's "I Love It" music video, followed by references to the 2018 FIFA World Cup and the Dame Tu Cosita dance craze. The 'Sister Squad' (James Charles, Dolan Twins and Emma Chamberlain) are then shown in outer space, driving a car resembling Elon Musk's Tesla Roadster.

The video ends with Smith laughing and watching the aforementioned battle bus through a pair of binoculars. He states "That's hot, that's hot." While the credits are playing, Primitive Technology is featured, sculpting the YouTube Rewind logo with clay.

Cast 
Below is a list of starring cast members in YouTube Rewind 2018, derived from the video's description:

 10Ocupados
 Adam Rippon
 Afros e Afins por Nátaly Neri
 Alisha Marie
 Ami Rodriguez
 Anwar Jibawi
 AsapSCIENCE
 AuthenticGames
 BB Ki Vines
 Bearhug
 Bie The Ska
 Bilingirl Chika
 Bongo Cat (@StrayRogue and @DitzyFlama)
 Bokyem TV
 CajuTV
 Casey Neistat
 Caspar
 Cherrygumms
 Collins Key
 Dagi Bee
 Desimpedidos
 Diva Depressão
 Dolan Twins
 Domics
 Dotty TV
 Elle Mills
 Emma Chamberlain
 Enes Batur
 EnjoyPhoenix
 EroldStory
 FAP TV
 FavijTV
 Fischer's
 Furious Jumper
 Gabbie Hanna
 GamingWithKev
 Gen Halilintar
 Gongdaesang
 gymvirtual
 Hannah Stocking
 HikakinTV
 How Ridiculous
 illymation
 ItsFunneh
 Jaiden Animations
 James Charles
 John Oliver
 Jordindian
 Jubilee Media
 JukiLop
 julioprofe
 Katya Zamolodchikova
 Kaykai Salaider
 Kelly MissesVlog
 Krystal Yam & family
 LA LATA
 Lachlan
 LaurDIY
 Lele Pons
 Life Noggin
 Lilly Singh
 Liza Koshy
 Los Polinesios
 Lucas the Spider
 Luisito Comunica (Rey Palomo)
 Luzu
 Lyna
Manual do Mundo
 Markiplier
 Marques Brownlee
 Marshmello
 Mason Ramsey
 Me Poupe!
 Merrell Twins
 Michael Dapaah
 MissRemiAshten
 mmoshya
 Molly Burke
 Ms Yeah
 Muro Pequeno
 NickEh30
 NikkieTutorials
 Ninja
 Noor Stars
 Pautips
 Pinkfong Baby Shark
 Pozzi
 Primitive Technology
 RobleisIUTU
 Rosanna Pansino
 Rudy Mancuso
 Safiya Nygaard
 Sam Tsui
 SamHarveyUK
 SHALOM BLAC
 Simone Giertz
 skinnyindonesian24
 Sofia Castro
 sWooZie
 Tabbes
 Technical Guruji
 The Try Guys
 TheOdd1sOut
 Tiền Zombie v4
 Trevor Noah
 Trixie Mattel
 Wengie
 whinderssonnunes
 Will Smith
 Yammy
 Yes Theory

Reception 

Upon its release, Everyone Controls Rewind received universally negative reviews, receiving extensive backlash from critics, YouTubers and viewers alike. Many YouTubers deemed it the "worst Rewind ever", although the video received some praise for its display of YouTube animators. Criticisms ranged from the inclusion of celebrities and personalities who are not affiliated with YouTube (such as Will Smith, Ninja, John Oliver, and Trevor Noah) to the exclusion of major YouTube personalities, such as Shane Dawson, KSI, Logan Paul, MrBeast and PewDiePie, and popular feuds such as KSI vs Logan Paul and PewDiePie vs T-Series.

Other criticisms included what viewers had seen as the video's overuse of some trends, many of which were classified as outdated or unpopular, including Fortnite, as well as the lack of variety in references. It was also prominently criticized for its social commentary, which some felt was shoehorned into the video.  Many people were also angered with PewDiePie's exclusion, as his channel was the most-subscribed on the platform at the time.

Everyone Controls Rewind incorporated user comment suggestions as a part of the video, although many viewers stated that the trends that the video included were unpopular with the majority of the community, calling YouTube "out of touch" with its viewers and their interests. Julia Alexander of The Verge suggested that YouTube had intentionally left out the biggest moments on the platform in 2018 from the video in an attempt to appease concerned advertisers over controversies that had plagued the platform over the past 2 years, saying "it's increasingly apparent, however, that YouTube is trying to sell a culture that's different from the one millions of people come to the platform for, and that's getting harder for both creators and fans to swallow". Meira Gebel of Business Insider shared a similar sentiment, saying "The video appears to be an attempt for the company to keep advertisers on its side following a rather rocky 2018."

PewDiePie, who was not included in Everyone Controls Rewind, criticized the video, stating: "I'm almost glad I'm not in it. The reason why is because it's such a cringey video at this point which I think is quite a shame honestly." adding that "Rewind [used to be] something that seemed like an homage to the creators that year, it was something cool to be a part of". He further criticized the over-saturation of Fortnite, the inclusion of celebrities not associated with YouTube, and the lack of any mention of the outpouring of support on the platform for those who died before December, including Icelandic actor and YouTuber Stefán Karl Stefánsson. On top of his criticism, he, along with FlyingKitty, Party In Backyard, Grandayy and Dolan Dark, created their take of Everyone Controls Rewind on December 27, 2018, titled "YouTube Rewind 2018 but it's actually good", which focused on the notable memes of 2018. It received more than 7 million likes in less than 2 days, making it the second most liked non-music video on YouTube, while also having more than three times the number of likes compared to the official YouTube Rewind video.

Marques Brownlee, who was prominently featured in the video, said Rewind had once been a "big celebration of YouTubers and the biggest events that had happened on the site in a particular year. It became an honor to be included in Rewind. But now YouTube saw Rewind as a way to showcase all the best stuff that happens on YouTube for advertisers." He concluded that "Instead of honoring creators, it is now a list of advertiser-friendly content. Rewind has turned into a giant ad for YouTube".

Only a few portions of the video received praise, with many viewers applauding Jaiden Animations for incorporating PewDiePie's chair, as well as other easter eggs, into her segment of the video.

In a video uploaded in February 2019, then-YouTube CEO Susan Wojcicki said "Even at home, my kids told me it (Everyone Controls Rewind) was cringey."  She promised a better Rewind for 2019 and revealed several priorities for YouTube for the year.

Dislikes 

On December 13, 2018, just a week after it was uploaded, it became the most-disliked video in the history of the website, beating the previous record-holder: the music video for Justin Bieber's "Baby".

In a statement given to media outlets, YouTube spokeswoman Andrea Faville said that "dethroning 'Baby' in dislikes wasn't exactly our goal this year." She added: "Honest feedback can suck, but we are listening and we appreciate how much people care. Trying to capture the magic of YouTube in one single video is like trying to capture lightning in a bottle. We also learned that creating content can be really hard and this underscores our respect and admiration for YouTube creators doing it every day," adding in a tweet that "we hear what you're saying, and we want to make next year better for all of you."

After the release of the video and subsequent backlash, YouTube discussed possible options to prevent abuse of the dislike button by "dislike mobs", such as making the like–dislike ratings invisible by default, prompting disliking users to explain their dislike, removing the dislike count or the dislike button entirely. Tom Leung, the director of project management at YouTube, described the possibility of removing the dislike button to be the most extreme and undemocratic option, as "not all dislikes are from dislike mobs." In November 2021, dislike counts became viewable only by a video's uploader, in an attempt to "help better protect our creators from harassment, and reduce dislike attacks — where people work to drive up the number of dislikes on a creator's videos."

The API for dislikes was removed on December 13, 2021, coinciding with the third anniversary of the milestone.

References

External links 
 
 Video (on YouTube)
 Portal-A project page

2018 YouTube videos
2018 controversies
2018 in Internet culture
Fortnite
Viral videos
Works about video games
YouTube controversies
Internet memes introduced in 2018
Internet memes